The Division of Lingiari is an Australian electoral division in the Northern Territory that covers the entirety of the territory outside of the Division of Solomon, which covers Darwin and surrounding areas. The division also includes the Christmas and Cocos (Keeling) Islands.

Lingiari includes all of the Northern Territory's remote Indigenous communities, most of whom vote when visited by mobile polling teams during the election campaign.

The current MP is Marion Scrymgour, a member of the Australian Labor Party. Scrymgour herself is Indigenous and inherited Tiwi identity from her mother.

Geography
Federal electoral division boundaries in Australia are determined at redistributions by a redistribution committee appointed by the Australian Electoral Commission. Redistributions occur for the boundaries of divisions in a particular state or territory, and they occur every seven years, or sooner if a state or territory's representation entitlement changes or when divisions of a state or territory are malapportioned.

History
The division was named after prominent Aboriginal rights activist Vincent Lingiari AM (1908–1988), who was a member of the Gurindji nation. Other divisions named after Aboriginal Australians are Bennelong in New South Wales, Blair and Bonner in Queensland, and Cooper and Nicholls in Victoria.

The division was one of the two established when the former Division of Northern Territory was redistributed on 21 December 2000. It is the second largest electorate in terms of area in Australia, the largest being the Division of Durack in Western Australia. The division also includes the Christmas and Cocos (Keeling) Islands. From its formation until the 2022 Australian federal election, it had been held by Warren Snowdon of the Australian Labor Party, who transferred there after the Division of Northern Territory was abolished.

At the time of the 2004 election, there were 58,205 people enrolled to vote in Lingiari, making it one of the least populous divisions in Australia.  Lingiari has the largest Indigenous population in Australia; as of the 2013 election, 42.7 percent of the population was Indigenous.

Members

Election results

References

External links
 Division of Lingiari - Australian Electoral Commission

Electoral divisions of Australia
Constituencies established in 2000
2000 establishments in Australia